The National Hospital of Tropical Diseases is a hospital in Hanoi, Vietnam.

History 

Its founding can be traced back to the Cong Vong Hospital, a 1911 established facility for the treatment of infectious diseases. In 1929 this was expanded into the Robin Hospital. In March 1945 it was renamed to the Bach Mai Hospital. In 1989, the  Institute of Clinical Medicine for Tropical Diseases was established, a merger between the Department of Infectious Diseases, Department of Microbiology, the Bach Mai Institute and the Department of Infectious Diseases of Hanoi Medical University.

The Institute of Clinical Medicine for Tropical Diseases was awarded a Hero of Labor for its role in fighting the SARS outbreak. The Department of Infectious Diseases of the Hanoi Medical University is located inside the hospital, as well as the Oxford University Clinical Research Unit.

During the COVID-19 pandemic in Vietnam, all COVID-19 patients from Northern Vietnam were treated at the hospital.

References 

Hospitals in Vietnam
Hanoi